"I Touch Roses" is the second single released by the American synth-pop band Book of Love. The song was included on the band's eponymous debut album Book of Love in 1986. The B-side to the single is "Lost Souls", a remixed version of which also appeared on their debut album.

Although "I Touch Roses" failed to reach the Billboard Hot 100 chart, it did make the Top 10 on the Billboard Hot Dance Club Play chart, where it peaked at no. 8 in 1985.

"I Touch Roses" was written by band member Theodore ("Ted") Ottaviano. After the success of their first single, "Boy", "I Touch Roses" followed a similar trajectory, securing that the band would record a full album for Sire Records. In 2009, Ted Ottaviano revealed, "We didn't know it at the time, but thankfully, with 'I Touch Roses', it was not preordained that Sire was developing us at the time. There was no grand scheme. It was more a la carte. But then people started picking up on 'Roses' and then the album happened."

In 2001, after having success with new remixes of "Boy", the record company commissioned DJ/producer Markus Schulz to attempt a follow up by remixing "I Touch Roses" for the new millennium. A promotional 12" single was released in 2001, featuring the Markus Schulz Dark Rose Remix, and an instrumental version of the remix on the flipside, in order to further promote Book of Love's greatest hits album, I Touch Roses: The Best of Book of Love. The new remixes did not chart, and are not included on the album.

Track listings

1985 7" Single   (Sire Records 7-28428)
Side A:
"I Touch Roses" - 3:23

Side B:
"Lost Souls" - 4:11

1985 12" Maxi-Single   (Sire Records 0-20381)
Side A: 
"I Touch Roses" (Long Stemmed Version) - 5:43
Side B:
"I Touch Roses" - 3:24
"Lost Souls" - 4:11

1986 7" Remix Single   (Sire Records 928 673-7)
Side A:
"I Touch Roses" (Remix) - 3:19

Side B:
"Lost Souls" (Remix) - 6:46

1986 12" Maxi-Single   (Sire Records 920 482-0)
Side A: 
"I Touch Roses" (A Daniel Miller Extended Remix) - 5:35
Side B:
"I Touch Roses" (7" Remix) - 3:19
"Lost Souls" (Remix) - 6:46

2001 12" Promo   (Reprise Records PRO-A-100579)
Side A:
"I Touch Roses" (Markus Schulz Dark Rose Remix) - 8:45
Side B:
"I Touch Roses" (Markus Schulz Dark Rose Instrumental) - 8:45

Personnel 
Written by Theodore Ottaviano. All instruments arranged, programmed, and performed by Book of Love.

 Susan Ottaviano - Lead vocals
 Jade Lee - Percussion
 Lauren Roselli - Keyboards
 Ted Ottaviano - Keyboards

1985 version credits
 Engineered by Steve Peck
 Recorded and mixed at Unique Recording, NYC
 Mastered with Herb Powers at Frankford Wayne, NYC
 Produced by Ivan Ivan
 Art Direction: Zoë Brotman/Studio Zed
 Cover Art: Herbert Lee
 Photo: David La Chapelle
 Clothes by: Jeffrey Costello
 Hair and Make-up: Jill Sunshine

2001 remixes credits
 Produced by Ivan Ivan
 Remix and additional production by Markus Schulz.

Charts

Official versions

Official versions of B-side "Lost Souls"

" * " denotes that version is available as digital download

References

1985 singles
1985 songs
Book of Love (band) songs
Sire Records singles